Encosta do Sol is a civil parish in the municipality of Amadora, Portugal. It was formed in 2013 by the merger of the former parishes Alfornelos and Brandoa. The population in 2011 was 28,261, in an area of 2.8 km2.

References

Parishes of Amadora